Phunga kaGumede was a King of the Zulu people in modern-day South Africa. 
He succeeded his father, Gumede kaZulu, as King in the early 18th century. He died in 1727 and was succeeded by his brother Mageba kaGumede.

Zulu kings
1727 deaths
18th-century monarchs in Africa
Year of birth unknown